The National Union of Workers was an Australian trade union formed in 1989.

History
The National Union of Workers of Australia was formed by a progressive amalgamation of unions from 1989 onwards in a time when all Australian unions were merging, with varying degrees of success.  These unions merged into the one larger union to pool their expertise and resources, so they could provide members with a larger range of quality services.

The six unions which form the National Union of Workers were established in the early part of last century and have been at the forefront of workers' achievements for nearly 100 years:
 Federated Storemen and Packers Union (Est. 1912)
 Federated Rubber and Allied Workers Union (Est. 1908)
 Federated Cold Storage and Meat Preserving Employees' Union (Est. 1908)
 Federated Millers and Manufacturing Grocers Union (Est. 1909)
 Commonwealth Foremen's Association (Est. 1912)
 United Sales Representatives and Commercial Travellers Guild (Est. 1888)

In 2018 it was announced the National Union of Workers was in the process of merging with another union, United Voice. In June 2019, the Fair Work Commission approved a vote on the proposed merger between the two unions which will be held in August. On 30 August 2019 the Australian Electoral Commission declared the result of the vote, with just over 95% of members supporting the amalgamation. The name of the new union was the United Workers Union. As a result of the amalgamation, the National Union of Workers will be deregistered as part of the merger and its members folded into the larger United Voice. On 11 November 2019, the new United Workers Union was formed.

Coverage

The National Union of Workers covered workers in the following industries:
 Warehousing and distribution
 Food manufacturing
 Rubber, plastic and cable-making
 Dairy
 Cold storage
 Poultry, fish and game processing
 Skin and hide
 Wool
 Oil
 Pet food
 Pharmaceutical manufacturing
 Milling
 Market research
 Merchandising and sales representatives

Politics
The National Union of Workers was one of the most powerful unions in the Australian Labor Party and its national Labor Right faction. It was generally a member along with other right-wing unions of the various state Labor Right factions that make up the national Labor Right faction. However it made up its own Labor Right faction in Victoria called Labor Action and in Queensland called Labor Unity (also known as the Old Guard). The National Union of Workers has also funded and supported the left-wing party, the Victorian Socialists.

References

External links

 

International Union of Food, Agricultural, Hotel, Restaurant, Catering, Tobacco and Allied Workers' Associations
Defunct trade unions of Australia
General unions
Trade unions established in 1989
1989 establishments in Australia